There are 65 lakes known as Long Lake in Ontario, Canada.

Algoma
Long Lake (Varley Township, Ontario) 
Long Lake (Albanel Township, Ontario) 
Long Lake (North Shore, Ontario) 
Long Lake (Fontaine Township, Ontario) 
Long Lake (Sampson Township, Ontario) 
Long Lake (Bruyere Township, Ontario) 
Long Lake (Common Township, Ontario) 
Long Lake (Huron Shores, Ontario)

Cochrane
Long Lake (Timmins) 
Long Lake (Potter Township, Ontario)

Frontenac County
Long Lake (South Frontenac, Ontario)
Long Lake (Central Frontenac, Ontario)

Haliburton County
Long Lake (Highlands East, Ontario)
Long Lake (Dysart et al, Ontario)

Kenora
Long Lake (Pelican Township, Ontario) 
Long Lake (Machin, Ontario)
Long Lake (Kamungish River) 
Long Lake (Redvers Township, Ontario) 
Long Lake (Wabigoon River)

Manitoulin
Long Lake (Central Manitoulin, Ontario) 
Long Lake (Northeastern Manitoulin and the Islands, Ontario)

Muskoka
Long Lake (Bracebridge, Ontario) 
Long Lake (Wood Township, Ontario) (Muskoka Lakes) 
Long Lake (Cardwell Township, Ontario) (Muskoka Lakes)
Long Lake (Bala, Ontario) (Muskoka Lakes)

Nipissing
Long Lake (Kearney, Nipissing District, Ontario) 
Long Lake (East Ferris, Ontario)
Long Lake (Calvin, Ontario)

Parry Sound
Long Lake (Humphrey Township, Ontario) (Seguin) 
Long Lake (Kearney, Parry Sound District, Ontario) 
Long Lake (Joly, Ontario) 
Long Lake (East Mills Township, Ontario)
Long Lake (Wilson Township, Ontario) 
Long Lake (Nipissing, Ontario) 
Long Lake (The Archipelago, Ontario) 
Long Lake (Foley Township, Ontario) (Seguin)

Peterborough County
Long Lake (Douro-Dummer, Ontario) 
Long Lake (Havelock-Belmont-Methuen, Ontario)
Long Lake (North Kawartha, Ontario)

Rainy River
Long Lake (Rainy River District, Ontario)

Renfrew County
Long Lake (Laurentian Valley, Ontario)
Long Lake (Greater Madawaska, Ontario) 
Long Lake (Wylie Township, Ontario) (Laurentian Hills) 
Long Lake (Rolph Township, Ontario) (Laurentian Hills)

Sudbury
Long Lake (Sables-Spanish Rivers, Ontario) 
Long Lake (Sudbury, Ontario) (Greater Sudbury)
Long Lake (Ermatinger Township, Ontario) 
Long Lake (Capreol, Ontario) (Greater Sudbury)
Long Lake (Kelly Township, Ontario) 
Long Lake (Turner Township, Ontario)

Timiskaming
Long Lake (Sharpe Township, Ontario)
Long Lake (Lorrain Township, Ontario)
Long Lake (Milner Township, Ontario) 
Long Lake (Lebel Township, Ontario)

Thunder Bay
Long Lake (Saganagons Lake) 
Long Lake (Laberge Township, Ontario) 
Long Lake (Kashabowie, Ontario) 
Long Lake (Terrace Bay, Ontario) 
Long Lake (Shuniah, Ontario) 
Long Lake (Athelstane Lake) 
Long Lake (Thunder Bay District) (Longlac)

Southern Ontario
Long Lake (Lanark County)
Long Lake (Simcoe County) 
Long Lake (Leeds and Grenville United Counties, Ontario) 
Long Lake (Kawartha Lakes) 
Long Lake (Hastings County)

See also
List of lakes in Ontario

References

Search at Geographical Names of Canada using parameters "Name: Long Lake Feature type: LAKE Province/Territory: ON". Accessdate 2010-06-13.

Lakes of Ontario